Joe Gallardo (born January 1, 1998) is an American professional soccer player who plays as a forward for Union Omaha in USL League One.

Career
Gallardo was acquired by Orlando City B on January 25, 2017, after previously spending time with Monterrey's youth team. Gallardo was named to the USL League One All-League First Team.

Gallardo spent the 2019 season with Richmond Kickers where he led the club in goals. On December 5, 2019, Gallardo was transferred to USL Championship club Real Monarchs for an undisclosed transfer fee.

During the 2020 winter transfer window, Gallardo became a top target for multiple clubs in Mexico's top-flight. Eventually, Liga MX side Queretaro FC was able to secure the striker's signature on a multi-year contract. He made his debut during the Guardianes 2021 tournament.

Gallardo was loaned to Liga de Expansión MX side Correcaminos UAT for the 2022 season. On 14 February 2023, he signed with Union Omaha, thus returning to USL League One.

Personal
Born in the United States, Gallardo is of Mexican descent which makes him eligible to play for Mexico.

References

External links
 
 
 

1998 births
Living people
American soccer players
American sportspeople of Mexican descent
Association football forwards
Orlando City B players
Richmond Kickers players
Real Monarchs players
Querétaro F.C. footballers
Union Omaha players
Soccer players from San Diego
United States men's youth international soccer players
USL Championship players
USL League One players
Liga MX players